Park Place Historic District may refer to:

Park Place Historic District (Cloquet, Minnesota), listed on the National Register of Historic Places in Carlton County, Minnesota
Park Place Historic District (Brooklyn) - Designated in 2012 by the New York City Landmarks Preservations Commission
Park Place Historic District (Niagara Falls, New York), listed on the National Register of Historic Places in Niagara County, New York
Park Place Historic District (Norfolk, Virginia), listed on the National Register of Historic Places in Norfolk, Virginia